John Seward Johnson may refer to:
John Seward Johnson I, founded the Harbor Branch Oceanographic Institution
John Seward Johnson II, American artist
John Seward Johnson III (born 1966), American filmmaker, philanthropist, and entrepreneur

See also
 John Johnson (disambiguation)